The 1998–99 NBA season was the 31st season for the Phoenix Suns in the National Basketball Association. On March 23, 1998, the owners of all 29 NBA teams voted 27–2 to reopen the league's collective bargaining agreement, seeking changes to the league's salary cap system, and a ceiling on individual player salaries. The National Basketball Players Association (NBPA) opposed to the owners' plan, and wanted raises for players who earned the league's minimum salary. After both sides failed to reach an agreement, the owners called for a lockout, which began on July 1, 1998, putting a hold on all team trades, free agent signings and training camp workouts, and cancelling many NBA regular season and preseason games. Due to the lockout, the NBA All-Star Game, which was scheduled to be played in Philadelphia on February 14, 1999, was also cancelled. However, on January 6, 1999, NBA commissioner David Stern, and NBPA director Billy Hunter finally reached an agreement to end the lockout. The deal was approved by both the players and owners, and was signed on January 20, ending the lockout after 204 days. The regular season began on February 5, and was cut short to just 50 games instead of the regular 82-game schedule.

During the off-season, the Suns signed free agent Tom Gugliotta, acquired Luc Longley from the Chicago Bulls, acquired rookie forward Pat Garrity from the Dallas Mavericks, signed Chris Morris, and re-signed former Suns center Joe Kleine. Head coach Danny Ainge returned for his third season with the team. After a 15–18 start, the Suns won 12 of their final 17 games, and finished tied with the Sacramento Kings for third in the Pacific Division with a record of 27–23. All home games were played in America West Arena.

Starting point guard Jason Kidd finished the regular season leading the league with 10.8 assists per game, plus contributing 2.3 steals per game. Four Suns would average double-digits in points per game, with Gugliotta leading the team with 17.0 points and 8.9 rebounds, plus contributing 1.4 steals per game, while Kidd averaged 16.9 points per game, Clifford Robinson provided with 16.4 points and 1.5 steals per game, and Rex Chapman contributed 12.1 points per game. Kidd also led the league in total minutes played and was third in total steals, before being selected to both the All-NBA and All-Defensive First Teams. In addition, sixth man Danny Manning averaged 9.1 points and 4.4 rebounds per game off the bench, while Longley provided the team with 8.7 points and 5.7 rebounds per game, and George McCloud contributed 8.9 points per game off the bench.

The 7th-seeded Suns made the playoffs for the 11th consecutive season before being swept in the Western Conference First Round to the 2nd-seeded, and Pacific winner-Portland Trail Blazers, three games to zero. Following the season, Manning and Garrity were both traded to the Orlando Magic, who then traded Manning to the Milwaukee Bucks two weeks later, while McCloud signed as a free agent with the Denver Nuggets, Kleine signed with the Portland Trail Blazers, and Morris retired.

Offseason

NBA draft

This was the first year in franchise history that the Suns had no draft picks. Their first-round pick (which turned into Tyronn Lue) was traded to the Denver Nuggets the previous year in the Antonio McDyess deal, and their second-round pick (which turned into Greg Buckner) was traded to the Dallas Mavericks in 1996 in the Jason Kidd deal.

Roster

Regular season

Standings

Record vs. opponents

Playoffs

Game log

|- align="center" bgcolor="#ffcccc"
| 1
| May 8
| @ Portland
| L 85–95
| Jason Kidd (17)
| Tom Gugliotta (9)
| Jason Kidd (7)
| Rose Garden20,040
| 0–1
|- align="center" bgcolor="#ffcccc"
| 2
| May 10
| @ Portland
| L 99–110
| Garrity, McCloud (15)
| Tom Gugliotta (9)
| Jason Kidd (12)
| Rose Garden20,588
| 0–2
|- align="center" bgcolor="#ffcccc"
| 3
| May 12
| Portland
| L 93–103
| Clifford Robinson (24)
| Gugliotta, Robinson (7)
| Jason Kidd (12)
| America West Arena17,306
| 0–3
|-

Awards and honors

Week/Month
 Jason Kidd was named Player of the Month for April.
 Jason Kidd was named Player of the Week for games played April 12 through April 18.

All-Star
All-Star weekend was cancelled due to the 1998–99 NBA lockout.

Season
 Jason Kidd was named to the All-NBA First Team. Kidd also finished fifth in MVP voting.
 Jason Kidd was named to the NBA All-Defensive First Team.
 Clifford Robinson finished seventh in Defensive Player of the Year voting, and finished tenth in Most Improved Player voting.
 Jason Kidd led the league in assists per game with a 10.8 average, and total assists with 539.
 Jason Kidd led the league in minutes played with 2060.

Player statistics

Season

† – Minimum 183 field goals made.
^ – Minimum 34 three-pointers made.
# – Minimum 76 free throws made.

Playoffs

^ – Minimum 5 three-pointers made.
# – Minimum 10 free throws made.

Transactions

Trades

Free agents

Additions

Subtractions

Player Transactions Citation:

References

 Standings on Basketball Reference

Phoenix Suns seasons